The 2021 LA Galaxy II season was the club's 8th season of existence, and their 8th season in the USL Championship, the second tier of the United States Soccer Pyramid.

Squad information

Transfers

Transfers in

Transfers out

Competitions

Friendlies

USL Championship

Standings

Western Conference

Pacific Division

Results summary

Regular season 
All times in Pacific Time Zone.

April

May

June

July

August

September

October

See also 
 2021 in American soccer
 2021 LA Galaxy season

References

External links 
 

LA Galaxy II seasons
LA Galaxy II
LA Galaxy II
LA Galaxy II